Maria Marten, or The Murder in the Red Barn is a 1935 British film melodrama film starring Tod Slaughter and Eric Portman. It was directed by Milton Rosmer. It is based on the true story of the 1827 Red Barn Murder where a 25 year old mother is shot dead by her lover (Squire William Corder) and her stepmother claims to have dreamt of the murder the night of the event, before the young woman's body was discovered. The film is also known as Murder in the Red Barn (short UK title).

The film is based on the popular 19th-century melodramas about the case and is highly theatrical, with an opening in which all the characters are introduced by a Master of Ceremonies in front of a painted backdrop, but is also slightly more lavishly produced and cinematically inventive than the later films directed by Tod Slaughter's producer George King. Slaughter gives a full-throated over-the-top performance in a calculatedly melodramatic style, encouraging the audience to vicariously share in his villainy; this approach became his trademark and gives his films a cult status of their own peculiar kind.

Plot

William Corder seduces then murders innocent country maiden Maria Marten in the red barn before burying her body beneath the barn floor. She gets murdered because she becomes pregnant and too annoying for William. Her gypsy lover Carlos is hunted down as a suspect, but brings Corder to justice.

Cast 
Tod Slaughter as Squire William Corder
Sophie Stewart as Maria Marten
D. J. Williams as Farmer Thomas Marten
Eric Portman as Carlos, the gypsy
Clare Greet as Mrs. Marten
Gerard Tyrell as Timothy Winterbottom
Ann Trevor as Nan, the maid
Stella Rho as Gypsey Crone
Dennis Hoey as Gambling Winner
Quentin McPhearson as Matthew Sennett
Antonia Brough as Maud Sennett
Noel Dainton as Officer Steele of the Bow Street Runners

External links 

1936 films
British crime thriller films
1936 crime drama films
British black-and-white films
Films directed by Milton Rosmer
British crime drama films
Melodrama films
1930s English-language films
1930s British films